Set Me Free may refer to:

Film 
 Set Me Free (1924 film), a German silent film
Set Me Free, a 1989 Hong Kong film featuring Cecilia Yip
 Set Me Free (1999 film) (Emporte-moi), a French-Canadian film directed by Léa Pool
 Set Me Free (2014 film) (Geoin), a South Korean film

Literature 
 Set Me Free, a novel by Miranda Beverly-Whittemore, winner of the 2007 Janet Heidinger Kafka Prize

Music

Albums 
 Set Me Free (Jennifer Knapp album) or the title song, 2014
 Set Me Free (Jermaine Stewart album) or the title song (see below), 1992
 Set Me Free (Marion Raven album) or the title song, 2007
 Set Me Free or the title song, by A. R. Rahman, 1991
 Set Me Free, by Mal Waldron, 1969
 Code#03 Set Me Free or the title song, by Ladies' Code, 2019

Songs 
 "Set Me Free" (Dillon Francis and Martin Garrix song), 2014
 "Set Me Free" (Eden Alene song), 2021
 "Set Me Free" (Jermaine Stewart song), 1992
 "Set Me Free" (The Kinks song), 1965
 "Set Me Free" (Mary J. Blige song), 2017
 "Set Me Free" (Velvet Revolver song), 2003
 Set Me Free (Twice song), 2023
 "Privilege (Set Me Free)", by the Patti Smith Group, 1978
 "Set Me Free", by Alexandra Stan from Unlocked
 "Set Me Free", by Avenged Sevenfold from Live in the LBC & Diamonds in the Rough
 "Set Me Free", by Billy Kenny
 "Set Me Free", by Casting Crowns from Lifesong
 "Set Me Free", by Charli XCX from True Romance
 "Set Me Free", by the Chicks from Gaslighter
 "Set Me Free", by Heathen from Breaking the Silence
 "Set Me Free", by the Heavy from Great Vengeance and Furious Fire
 "Set Me Free", by Jackson Hawke
 "Set Me Free", by Jaki Graham
 "Set Me Free", by John Cale from Walking on Locusts
 "Set Me Free", by Leea Nanos, competing to represent Australia in the Eurovision Song Contest 2019
 "Set Me Free", by Marshmello from Joytime III
 "Set Me Free", by Pennywise from Land of the Free?
 "Set Me Free", by the Pointer Sisters from Hot Together
 "Set Me Free", by Pushim, produced by DJ Premier
 "Set Me Free", by Raven-Symoné from This Is My Time
 "Set Me Free", by Robyn & La Bagatelle Magique from Love Is Free
 "Set Me Free", by the Sand Band from All Through the Night
 "Set Me Free", by Sweet from Sweet Fanny Adams
 "Set Me Free", by Utopia from Adventures in Utopia
 "Set Me Free / I've Got the Key", by Spacemen 3 from Recurring
 "Set Me Free (Empty Rooms)", by Jam & Spoon

See also 
 
 Set You Free (disambiguation)
 "Set Him Free", a 1959 song by Skeeter Davis